Naeema Butt is a Pakistani television actress. She is known for a supporting role of Ghazala in serial Ehd e Wafa. and a leading role of Areen in Mein Khwab Bunti Hoon. Apart from television, butt has also played a leading role in web series Weham.

Filmography

References

External links

Living people
Pakistani television actresses
Punjabi people
Year of birth missing (living people)
21st-century Pakistani actresses